Sophie of Württemberg (Sophie Friederike Matilda; 17 June 1818 – 3 June 1877) was Queen of the Netherlands as the first wife of King William III. Sophie separated from William in 1855 but continued to perform her duties as queen in public. She was known for her progressive and liberal views and corresponded with several famous intellectuals.

Biography

Sophie was born in Stuttgart; her parents were King William I of Württemberg and Grand Duchess Catherine Pavlovna of Russia, the fourth eldest daughter of Tsar Paul I. Shortly after Sophie's birth, her mother died, and she was cared for by her aunt, Catharina of Württemberg. She was niece of tsars Alexander I and Nicholas I of Russia.

She had a close relationship with her father and her sister Marie, but not to her stepmother. She was given a broad education by her father: after first being tutored in the common accomplishments by governesses customary for all upper-class girls of her time, she was additionally tutored by educated male tutors in history, geography and literature and acquainted with the works of Corneille, Racine, Kant and Hegel. When she was sixteen, she and her sister were taken by their father on an educational trip to Italy, which was otherwise customary for upper class males.

She was related to the Bonaparte family through her maternal aunt, and personally acquainted with both the future Napoleon III and Mathilde Bonaparte from her childhood, and corresponded with the latter her entire life. Through her progressive father, Sophie came in contact with liberal ideas from her early youth and supported democracy rather than royal absolutism.

Crown princess

Sophie married her maternal first cousin, the future Prince of Orange (later King William III), in Stuttgart on 18 June 1839 with the idea that she would in the end succeed in dominating him.

The marriage was arranged. Her father, while being a liberal progressive in other aspects, still favored dynastic marriages and wished for his daughters to marry monarchs. Prior to her marriage, King Otto of Greece and Duke William of Brunswick were possible suitors for Princess Sophie. The engagement with the first came to nothing because Princess Sophie's ambitious father had no confidence in the newly established Greek monarchy of Otto. Chance prevented a proposal by the second candidate because her father let it be known that Princess Sophie was already betrothed. Sophie herself had preferred to marry William of Brunswick, and she stated herself that her marriage to William of the Netherlands was a sacrifice she made to her father.

After the wedding, Sophie and William settled in the Paleis aan het Plein in The Hague. Sophie came to have a good relationship to her father-in-law, William II of the Netherlands, as well as to her uncle-in-law Prince Frederick of the Netherlands. King William's mother, whom he completely relied on, was totally against the marriage to a daughter of the sister she loathed and treated her daughter-in-law and niece with disdain. She and her mother-in-law Anna were never to be on good terms: Anna was also her maternal aunt, but she had never been on good terms with her sister, Sophie's mother, and she had opposed the marriage between Sophie and her son.

The marriage between Sophie and William was arranged and never a happy one. Their relationship was not improved by the birth of their children, whose upbringing was a constant cause for conflict between their parents. William was constantly unfaithful. Sophie did not wish to live with him and devoted herself on cultivating her own intellectual interests and the private study of various subjects. A divorce was contemplated early on, but was continually postponed because it was not seen as suitable for a king and queen.

Queen

In March 1849, king William II suddenly died. William III and Sophie became king and queen of the Netherlands on 12 May 1849 and settled in the Noordeinde Palace.

The relationship between Sophie and William was not improved, and they continued to be in a state of constant conflict. Their son Maurice died in 1850 after both parents had hired a different physician since they could not agree on how his illness should be treated. When Sophie was pregnant with their third son Alexander (1851–1884), William had their eldest son sent to boarding school despite Sophie's opposition.

Intellectually, Queen Sophie was superior to her husband. She, on the other hand, did not fit his sensual character. While he loved contemporary painting, music and theatre, she had a specific interest in history and science. William III had several extramarital relations. She let it be publicly known that she found him inferior and unsuitable to be king, and that she would do better as a regent for her son.

The discussions of divorce continued after they became king and queen. Both Sophie and William mutually wished to have a divorce, but a divorce was seen as an impossible scandal because of their position. By the mediation of Prince Frederick of the Netherlands, a formal separation without divorce was finalized in 1855, and it was decided that the couple was to remain formally married in public, but allowed to live separate lives in practice. William was to be given full right to decide about the upbringing of their eldest son, while Sophie was given full custody of their youngest, Alexander. Sophie was to fulfill her representational duties as queen in public, but allowed to live her private life as she wished.

From 1855 the couple lived separately during the summer season, he at Het Loo Palace and she at Huis ten Bosch Palace. She also spent time in Stuttgart, with her own family. She engaged in a big correspondence with various friends and intellectuals, as well as making trips and meeting them in person, among them Ernest Renan, Julius von Mohl, Leopold von Ranke and John Lothrop Motley, many of whom expressed admiration for her intellect. She regularly visited her father, who remained her advisor and confidant until his death, after which he was succeeded by her friend George Villiers, Lord Clarendon (1800-1870), with whom she corresponded. She also enjoyed regular trips to France to visit Napoleon III and empress Eugénie. During the Crimean war she sided against her Russian relatives with her friends Clarendon and Napoleon III. Aside from her interests in culture and science she was also interested in spiritism, and invited the medium Daniel Home to Noordeinde Palace in 1858 to hold seance. She participated in the public debate and published an article in the famous Revue des Deux Mondes, in which she argued that the royal houses must keep up with the times.

Queen Sophie corresponded with several European scholars and maintained warm ties with Emperor Napoleon III and Queen Victoria. She protected and stimulated the arts, supported several charities, including animal protection and construction of public parks. As queen she attended the industrial exhibitions from the 1860s and engaged in the education of the mentally challenged. She also supported the Society for the Protection of Animals by becoming its protector upon its foundation in 1867. Sophie also supported the women's movement when it first formed in the Netherlands, and became the protector of the first women's organization in 1871: Arbeid Adelt.

Sophie was an unusual queen with her left leaning political opinions and scientific interests, and her non-dogmatic views on religion, her support for a progressive development and her disdain for etiquette gave her the soubriquet "la reine rouge" ('The Red Queen').

Sophie died at Huis ten Bosch Palace in the Hague. She was buried in her wedding dress, because, in her own view, her life had ended on the day she married.

Issue
 Prince William (1840–1879), Prince of Orange from 1849 until 1879.
 Prince Maurice (1843–1850) died in childhood. 
 Prince Alexander (1851–1884), Prince of Orange from 1879 until 1884.

Ancestry

Honours
 : Dame of the Order of Queen Maria Luisa, 2 March 1858
 : Dame of the Order of Sidonia, 1872

Arms

References

External links

 Royal House of the Netherlands and Grand-Ducal House of Luxembourg

|-

|-

1818 births
1877 deaths
Burials in the Royal Crypt at Nieuwe Kerk, Delft
Dutch queens consort
Duchesses of Limburg
Grand Ducal Consorts of Luxembourg
Nobility from Stuttgart
Princesses of Orange
Princesses of Württemberg
Daughters of kings